Kathryn Smith is a South African artist, curator, and researcher.  She works on curatorial projects, scholarly research, and studio practices, while her art deals with uncertainty, risk, and experimentation. She works in Cape Town and Stellenbosch. Her works have been exhibited and collected in South Africa and elsewhere. In 2006, she was appointed senior lecturer in the Department of Visual Arts at the University of Stellenbosch and head of the Fine Arts Studio Practice program.  She took a break in 2012/2013 to read for an MSc (Forensic Art) at the University of Dundee.

Education

Smith was born in Durban, South Africa in 1975.  In 1997 she graduated from Witwatersrand University(Wits) with a Bachelor in Fine Arts in Printmaking. Two years later in 1999 she received her Masters with distinction in Printmaking, also from Wits University.  She participated in artist residencies in the United States, Canada, Europe, and South Africa. She is currently based in Dundee, Scotland, where she is as a postgraduate student in the Centre for Anatomy and Human Identification, specializing in forensic art, under the Chevening Award scheme.

Artistic works and career

Smith views printmaking as the ability to reproduce and repeat images, thinking "of it as a kind of failed forgery; failed because there really was no 'original' from which to begin". She characterises her works are characterized as "crime artist and muse", and are visceral and uncanny. Her identity as both an artist and historical researcher led to her preoccupation with forensic methods of observation and perception. Her interests in forensic pathology and psychology lead to mixed media works that are art and social commentaries.

Smith defines herself as a performance artist, cultural manipulator of media, and photographer.  During her time at the Artist's Press in 2004, she produced a series of collages incorporating visual media, conversations, observations and sampled words from society.  These works challenge the viewer to play the role of a detective by "unraveling clues and references that may not announce themselves outright." Photography, creative and journalistic, theoretical and practical, occupies a central place in her work. In forensics, her works stretch modernity and photography and are often unnerving.  She cites her camera-based media as being heavily influenced by film, photography, new media, and theories of law, psychology and psychoanalysis.

While practicing fine art, Smith is also very involved in curatorial projects.  For example, one of her more recent collaborative projects, (with Roger van Wyk) Dada South? Exploring Dada legacies in South African art, 1960 to the present, investigated Dada tendencies in South African art for the past 50 years. This project was displayed in the Iziko South African National Gallery in 2009.

She has been represented by the Goodman Gallery since 2004. In 2009, Smith opened up Serialworks, her apartment studio in the Woodstock neighbourhood in Cape Town, as a project space. Her work can be found publicly in the South African National Gallery as well as the Johannesburg Art Gallery.  Her work is privately held throughout South Africa, the United States, the United Kingdom, and throughout Europe.

Solo exhibitions and projects

2012: Incident Room: Jacoba ‘Bubbles’ Schroeder, Gallery AOP, Johannesburg, South Africa
2009: In Camera, Fotografins Hus, Stockholm, Sweden
2004-5: Euphemism, National Arts Festival, Grahamstown; Nelson Mandela Metropolitan Art Museum, Port Elizabeth; Durban Art Gallery, Durban; Johannes Stegmann Art Gallery, University of the OFS, Bloemfontein; South African National Gallery, Cape Town; Standard Bank Gallery, Johannesburg, South Africa
2003: Jack in Johannesburg, as part of 24.7, Johannesburg Art Gallery, Johannesburg

Group exhibitions and projects

2012: 11th Havana Biennale ‘Art Practices and Social Imaginaries’, Havana, Cuba
2010/2011:  Noli Procrastinare: Public Art for Laingsburg, Laingsburg, Great Karoo, South Africa
2010: Biennale of Young Art, Moscow, Russia
2009: AiM Biennale, Marrakech, Morocco
2008: Revolutions – Forms that Turn, Sydney, Australia

Publications

Kathryn Smith conceptualised and edited One Million and Forty-Four Years (and Sixty Three Days), which is an anthology of current attitudes towards the avant-garde. She also did research and edited the monographic books Penny Siopis (2005) and Sam Nhlengethwa (2006), which were published by Goodman Gallery Editions. Kathryn was also a researcher and author of Barend de Wet (2011), published by SMAC, Stellenbosch.

Reviews and citations
South African Art Now (Sue Williamson)
10 Years, 100 Artists (ed. Sophie Perryer)

Organisations

Smith was a founding member of the Trinity Session in 2000 (active in the group until 2004), as well as a founder of The Premises Project Room.

Awards

 2012/2013: Chevening scholar
 2007: iCommons Summit Artist-in-Residence Scholarship; Croatia
 2005: National Arts Council funding Award, South Africa
 2003: Ampersand Fellowship, New York City
 2004: Business and Arts South Africa project partnership
 2003: Standard Bank Young Artist Award for 2004, Johannesburg, South Africa
 2002: Inaugural Wits Convocation/Alumni Bright Star Award for Outstanding Contribution to the Arts and Humanities, Johannesburg, South Africa
 2001: FNB Vita Art prize nominee, Durban, South Africa
 2000: ABSA Atelier Award (finalist), Johannesburg, South Africa
 1999: Sasol New Signatures winner, Pretoria Art Museum, Pretoria, South Africa

References

External links
Serial Works download link
Interview with dpi
Interview with ArtThrob

1975 births
Living people
21st-century South African women artists
Alumni of the University of Dundee
University of the Witwatersrand alumni